1713 Bancilhon, provisional designation , is an asteroid from the inner regions of the asteroid belt, approximately 5.7 kilometers in diameter.

It was discovered on 27 September 1951, by French astronomer Louis Boyer at Algiers Observatory in Algeria, North Africa, and named after French astronomer Odette Bancilhon.

Orbit and classification 

Bancilhon orbits the Sun in the inner main-belt at a distance of 1.8–2.6 AU once every 3 years and 4 months (1,215 days). Its orbit has an eccentricity of 0.18 and an inclination of 4° with respect to the ecliptic.

Physical characteristics 

According to the survey carried out by NASA's Wide-field Infrared Survey Explorer with its subsequent NEOWISE mission, Bancilhon measures 5.716 kilometers in diameter and its surface has an albedo of 0.259, which is rather typical for asteroids with stony composition. It has an absolute magnitude of 13.3. As of 2017, Bancilhons spectral type, rotation period and shape remain unknown.

Naming 

This minor planet was named for French astronomer Odette Bancilhon, Boyer's colleague and wife of astronomer Alfred Schmitt. Odette Bancilhon herself discovered the minor planet 1333 Cevenola at Algiers Observatory in 1934. The official  was published by the Minor Planet Center on 1 August 1978.

References

External links 
 Asteroid Lightcurve Database (LCDB), query form (info )
 Dictionary of Minor Planet Names, Google books
 Asteroids and comets rotation curves, CdR – Observatoire de Genève, Raoul Behrend
 Discovery Circumstances: Numbered Minor Planets (1)-(5000) – Minor Planet Center
 
 

001713
Brancilhon
Named minor planets
19510927